Guilleminite (Ba(UO2)3(SeO3)2(OH)4•3H2O) is a uranium mineral named by R. Pierrot, J. Toussaint, and T. Verbeek in 1965 in honor of Jean Claude Guillemin (1923–1994), a chemist and mineralogist. It is a rare uranium/selenium mineral found at the Musonoi Mine in the Katanga Province of the Democratic Republic of the Congo.

This secondary mineral also includes barium in its structure, in addition to selenium and uranium. It is bright yellow in colour and usually has an acicular crystal habit. It has a Mohs hardness of 2–3.

Pleochroism 
Guilleminite shows strong pleochroic attributes. Depending on the axis the gem is seen, guilleminite on the X axis can be seen in a bright yellow color, on the Y axis can be seen yellow, and on the Z axis is seen as a colorless gem.

References

Uranium(VI) minerals
Selenium minerals
Barium minerals
Orthorhombic minerals
Minerals in space group 31
Minerals described in 1965